Fred Harris is a British comedian and children's television presenter. Formerly a schoolteacher, he began his television career as a presenter of the BBC children's programme Play School, on which he appeared regularly between 1973 and 1988. During this time he was also a presenter on Ragtime and Chock-A-Block.

During the rise of the microcomputer in the early 1980s he fronted several home computing BBC programmes, including Micro Live (which formed part of BBC's ongoing Computer Literacy Project). He also presented a number of educational and schools programmes on the subject of maths, including ATV's Figure it Out (memorable for having a set which included a giant pocket calculator), Central Television's Basic Maths and Channel 4's Make It Count. In 1980 Harris appeared as a contestant on the first episode of The Adventure Game.

His career in comedy involved regular appearances in radio shows such as Huddwinks, The Half-Open University, The Burkiss Way and Star Terk II and in the television show End of Part One.

In the 1990s, he presented the Radio 4 programme The Litmus Test.

From the late 1990s to the present day he has worked on the British Forces Broadcasting Service (BFBS) children's programme Room 785. On this show he presents the "Broom Cupboard" slot introducing the forthcoming programmes.

References

British television presenters
Year of birth missing (living people)
Living people
BBC television presenters